Reggie Leslie Singletary (born January 17, 1964) is a former professional American football player who played defensive lineman and offensive lineman for five seasons for the Philadelphia Eagles of the National Football League (NFL).

1964 births
Living people
People from Whiteville, North Carolina
Players of American football from North Carolina
American football defensive tackles
American football offensive tackles
American football offensive guards
NC State Wolfpack football players
Philadelphia Eagles players
Green Bay Packers players